Sahebabad (also Romanized as Şāḩebābād; also known as Sa‘bābād and Şāḩebābād-e Sar Bīzhan) is a village in Gevar Rural District, Sarduiyeh District, Jiroft County, Kerman Province, Iran. At the 2006 census, its population was 218, in 35 families.

References 

Populated places in Jiroft County